The University of Providence (UP, formerly University of Great Falls) is a private Roman Catholic university in Great Falls, Montana. It is accredited by the Northwest Commission on Colleges and Universities.

History
The University of Providence was founded in 1932 as Great Falls Junior College for Women by Edwin Vincent O'Hara, the Catholic Bishop of Great Falls, in collaboration with the Sisters of Charity of Providence and the Ursuline Sisters. It became coeducational in 1937.

A year later, Sister Lucia Sullivan established the Great Falls Normal School to educate teachers.  At the time there were two schools, each operating under a different Catholic religious community. The union of the two schools was one of convenience and legality. In 1942, the institution was a single entity under the direction of the Sisters of Providence, and was renamed the Great Falls College of Education. By the early 1950s it became simply the College of Great Falls, and in 1995 was renamed the University of Great Falls. It was renamed University of Providence in July 2017.

Over the years UP has been involved in several outreach education efforts. For many years, it has had a resident center on the Fort Belknap Indian Reservation, and in Lewistown, as well as a continuing education program at Malmstrom Air Force Base. In addition to its campus offerings, UP serves 31 sites in Montana, southern Alberta and Wyoming through its Telecom Distance Learning Program, and is able to serve students around the world. The University of Providence offers undergraduate degrees in more than 20 programs and several master's degree programs.

The student body consists of approximately 1,100 undergraduate students and 200 graduate students.

Academics
The UP undergraduate program consists of two schools:

 The School of Liberal Arts and Sciences, which includes Arts and Humanities; Business Administration; Education; History, Language and Literature; Mathematics and Sciences
 The School of Health Professions, which contains Nursing, Epidemiology, Organizational Leadership, and Applied Health Informatics

Some of the more popular programs are criminal justice, human services, elementary education, counseling psychology, and paralegal studies. The school also offers teaching certificates.

The university offers two master's degrees:
 Master of Science in Counseling (MSC)
 Master of Science in Organizational Leadership (MSL), an online program.

UP's calendar consists of four-month semesters in the fall and spring, and a 12-week summer term.

Athletics
The U. of Providence (UP) athletic teams are called the Argonauts. The university is a member of the National Association of Intercollegiate Athletics (NAIA), primarily competing in the Frontier Conference for most of its sports since the 1999–2000 academic year (which they were a member on a previous stint from 1974–75 to 1983–84 before discontinuing its athletics program); while its men's and women's soccer, softball and men's and women's wrestling teams compete in the Cascade Collegiate Conference (CCC).

UP competes in 17 intercollegiate varsity sports: Men's sports include basketball, cross country, golf, ice hockey, soccer, track & field (indoor and outdoor) and wrestling; basketball, cross country, golf, soccer, softball, track & field (indoor and outdoor), volleyball and wrestling; and co-ed sports include the spirit squad. 

Former sports include men's lacrosse (until 2019), women's ice hockey (until 2020), and men's and women's rodeo (both until 2021). The men's lacrosse team used to compete a state rivalry tournament, known as the "Copper Cup", with the University of Montana, and Montana State University.

Admissions

The University of Providence has a rolling admission policy. Applications are considered without regard to race, gender, age, religion, marital status, sexual orientation, financial status, physical or mental disabilities, or national origin. Applicants may apply for admission at any time; however, they are strongly urged to apply at least one month prior to the first day of classes for the term they intend to begin. Required documents must be submitted before a student can be admitted. It is particularly important that the UP Placement Test be taken prior to registration. Prospective students must complete an admission application, which has no application fee, and provide an official high school transcript or official certificate of high school equivalency with scores from the General Education Development Test (GED). Results of ACT or SAT are recommended for academic advising and consideration for merit/no-need scholarships, but not required. To register, proof of two immunizations for measles and one immunization for rubella must be supplied.

Alumni
Paul G. Hatfield, United States Senator; Senior Judge of the United States District Court for the District of Montana; Chief Justice of the Montana Supreme Court
Jon Tester, United States Senator from Montana

References

External links
 Official website
 Official athletics website

 
University of Great Falls
Educational institutions established in 1932
Universities and colleges accredited by the Northwest Commission on Colleges and Universities
Frontier Conference
Education in Cascade County, Montana
Buildings and structures in Great Falls, Montana
1932 establishments in Montana
Catholic universities and colleges in Montana
Roman Catholic Diocese of Great Falls–Billings
Liberal arts colleges in Montana
Tourist attractions in Great Falls, Montana